Moritz Klotz (6 August 1813 – 11 August 1892) was a Berlin judge who became a politician in Prussia and, after 1871, in Germany.

His unusually long political career provides a line of continuity between the idealistic liberalisms of 1848 and the political liberalism that manifested itself in Germany after unification.

Life
Klotz was born into a Protestant family in Potsdam during the closing years of the Napoleonic Wars.   He attended secondary school (Gymnasium) in Potsdam and then went on to study jurisprudence at the university in nearby Berlin between 1831 and 1834.   He was articled in 1836, and in 1840 he had was appointed a junior judge (Kammergerichtsassessor) in the second Berlin district court, later becoming a Special Commissioner with the Berlin General Commission.

In  1848 Moritz Klotz was one of the members of the short-lived Prussian National Assembly in Berlin.   Following the end of the reactionary period that ensued, in 1860 he became a member of the Prussian House of Representatives till 1866, and then again between 1869 and his death in 1892.   Between 1877 and 1879 he served as the first vice-president of the parliament.

Initially he was a member of the faction headed up by Georg von Vincke, which subsequently came to be identified as the "Old Liberal" (Altliberale) grouping.   Moritz himself later joined the Progressive Party, founded in 1861, then switching in the 1880s to the short-lived Free-minded Party (Deutsche Freisinnige Partei).

Between 1871 and 1884, and then again between 1886 and 1890, he also served as a member of the National Reichstag.

References

1813 births
1892 deaths
People from Potsdam
People from the Margraviate of Brandenburg
German Protestants
German Progress Party politicians
German Free-minded Party politicians
Members of the Prussian House of Representatives
Members of the 1st Reichstag of the German Empire
Members of the 2nd Reichstag of the German Empire
Members of the 3rd Reichstag of the German Empire
Members of the 4th Reichstag of the German Empire
Members of the 5th Reichstag of the German Empire
Members of the 7th Reichstag of the German Empire
German revolutions of 1848–1849
Member of the Prussian National Assembly